Amilkar David Acosta Medina (born 1 November 1950) is a Colombian economist, and the 31st Minister of Mines and Energy of Colombia, serving in the administration of President Juan Manuel Santos Calderón. A former member of the Board of Directors of Ecopetrol and of the National Federation of Biofuels, Acosta was professor of mining law at the Universidad Externado de Colombia, and had served as Deputy Minister of Mines and Energy from 1990 to 1991.

Minister of Mines and Energy
On 5 September 2013, as part of a planned cabinet reshuffle, President Santos announced the appointment of Acosta as the new Minister of Mines and Energy. Acosta was sworn in on 11 September succeeding Federico Renjifo Vélez in the post.

References

External links

20th-century Colombian economists
Colombian Liberal Party politicians
Members of the Senate of Colombia
Presidents of the Senate of Colombia
Academic staff of Universidad Externado de Colombia
Ministers of Mines and Energy of Colombia
1950 births
Living people
People from La Guajira Department
University of Antioquia alumni
21st-century Colombian economists